The F4 Spanish Championship is an FIA Formula 4 racing series. The championship was planned to launch in 2015, though the inaugural season was cancelled and delayed until 2016. Koiranen GP was the promoter of the championship for the first two seasons. The current promoter is Agrupación Deportiva F4 Spain.

History
Gerhard Berger and the FIA Singleseater Commission launched the FIA Formula 4 in March 2013. The goal of the Formula 4 is to make the ladder to Formula 1 more transparent. Besides sporting and technical regulations, costs are regulated too. A car to compete in this category may not exceed €30.000 in purchase. A single season in Formula 4 may not exceed €100.000 in costs. The Spanish F4 will be the one of the second phase Formula 4 championship to be launched. The first phase championships was the Italian F4 Championship and the Formula 4 Sudamericana which started in 2014. The Spanish championship was launched by the RFEDA on 14 November 2014. French race car constructor Mygale was contracted to design and build all the cars. Ultimately the whole idea was abandoned.

With the announcement that Koiranen as the promoter of the championship, the Spanish F4 championship started in 2016. Due to this partnership, the championship made use of Tatuus cars, Abarth turbocharged engines and Hankook tyres, employing the same technical regulations as the SMP F4 Championship, which Koiranen also promoted.

Car
The championship features Tatuus designed and built cars. The cars are constructed out of carbon fibre and feature a monocoque chassis. From 2016 season to 2021, the series used model F4-T014. From the 2022 onwards, the series will use F4-T-421. The engine is a 1.4 turbo Abarth.

Champions

Drivers'

Teams'

Female Driver Trophy

Rookies'

Galfer Trophy

Drivers graduated to F2 

 Bold denotes an active Formula 2 driver.
 Gold background denotes F4 Spanish champion.

Circuits 

 Bold denotes a circuit will be used in the 2023 season.

References

External links
 

 
Formula racing series
Auto racing series in Spain
Formula 4 series
Recurring sporting events established in 2016